York Run is a  long 3rd order tributary to Georges Creek in Fayette County, Pennsylvania.

Variant names
According to the Geographic Names Information System, it has also been known historically as: 
 York's Run
 Yorks Run

Course
York Run rises about 0.75 miles southwest of Chadville, Pennsylvania, and then flows southwest to join Georges Creek about 2.5 miles southwest of Smithfield.

Watershed
York Run drains  of area, receives about 43.3 in/year of precipitation, has a wetness index of 373.76, and is about 48% forested.

See also
List of rivers of Pennsylvania

References

Rivers of Pennsylvania
Rivers of Fayette County, Pennsylvania
Allegheny Plateau